Guan Yuhang (born July 1, 1993) is a Chinese figure skater. He won bronze medals at the 2011 Asian Trophy and 2015 Chinese Championships. He made his senior Grand Prix debut at the 2014 Cup of China and his ISU Championship debut at the 2015 Four Continents.

Programs

Competitive highlights 
GP: Grand Prix; CS: Challenger Series; JGP: Junior Grand Prix

References

External links 
 

1993 births
Chinese male single skaters
Living people
Figure skaters from Harbin
Competitors at the 2017 Winter Universiade